Dendrophilia grandimacularis is a moth of the family Gelechiidae. It was described by H.H. Li and Z.M. Zheng in 1998. It is found in China (Jiangxi).

References

grandimacularis
Moths described in 1998